The Heart of Justice, is a 1992 television film starring Eric Stoltz, Jennifer Connelly, Dermot Mulroney and Dennis Hopper. It was Vincent Price's final acting role before his death in 1993.

Plot summary 
David Leader investigates a seemingly senseless murder, and in the course of it is drawn into the labyrinth of a sinisterly unique wealthy family. The family seems to revolve around its own beautiful and mysterious daughter, Emma Burgess, and soon Leader is deeply within her orbit as well.

Cast 
 Eric Stoltz as David Leader
 Jennifer Connelly as Emma Burgess
 Dermot Mulroney as Elliot Burgess
 Dennis Hopper as Austin Blair
 Harris Yulin as Keneally
 Paul Teschke as Alex
 Vincent Price as Reggie Shaw
 William H. Macy as Booth
 Bradford Dillman as Mr. Burgess
 Joanna Miles as Mrs. Burgess
 Katherine LaNasa as Hannah
 Keith Reddin as Simon

References

External links

1992 television films
1992 films
1992 crime thriller films
1992 crime drama films
1990s psychological thriller films
Films directed by Bruno Barreto
American crime drama films
American crime thriller films
TNT Network original films
Films about journalists
Films set in New York City
Films scored by Jonathan Elias
1990s American films